Ebert-Dulany House is a historic home located at Hannibal, Marion County, Missouri.  It was built about 1865, and is a two-story, Second Empire style brick dwelling. It has a mansard roof and sits on a rock-faced ashlar foundation.  It features a large bracketed hood above once sheltered a balcony and a wide bracketed frieze that runs below the modillioned cornice.  The house was restored in the late-1980s.

It was added to the National Register of Historic Places in 1983.  It is located in the Maple Avenue Historic District.

References

Individually listed contributing properties to historic districts on the National Register in Missouri
Houses on the National Register of Historic Places in Missouri
Second Empire architecture in Missouri
Houses completed in 1865
Houses in Hannibal, Missouri
National Register of Historic Places in Marion County, Missouri